Poseidonia is a village and a former municipality on the island of Syros, Cyclades, Greece.

Poseidonia may also refer to:

Places
 Poseidonia, Isthmus of Corinth, Greece, a harbour on the western end of the Corinth Canal
 Poseidonia (Magna Graecia), a ruined Ancient Greek and Roman city in southern Italy
 Basaidu, a village in Hormozgan, Iran
 Poseidonia, a mythical name for Athens from the Ancient Greek myth The Gift of Athena, the myth of the founding of Athens

Other uses
 An Ancient Greek festival celebrating the sea god Poseidon
 The realm of the Ancient Greek sea god Poseidon
 Posidonia, a sea grass genus, also called Poseidonia
 Thambemyia poseidonia,  species of fly, also called Conchopus poseidonius
 Innisfallen (ship) (1948), a ship named Poseidonia from 1967 to 1985
 , a ship named Poseidonia from 1988 to 2005

See also

 Posidonia (disambiguation)
 Poseidon (disambiguation)